Bere Alston railway station serves the village of Bere Alston in Devon, England,  north of Plymouth on the Tamar Valley Line to Gunnislake.

The route escaped complete closure in the 1960s mainly because places on the line have relatively poor road connections. However, one section of the branch, beyond Gunnislake to Callington, did not survive.

History

Beer Alston station was opened for passengers on 2 June 1890 by the Plymouth, Devonport and South Western Junction Railway as an intermediate station on that company's line from Lydford to Devonport, which – being in effect an extension of the London and South Western Railway's main line from London Waterloo station to Lydford, enabling the LSWR to reach Plymouth independently of the Great Western Railway – was immediately leased to the LSWR. Bere Alston station was 220 miles and 15 chains (354.35 km) from Waterloo.

The station was originally called Beer Alston after the local Beer family who owned several nearby villages. However, in 1897, the railway authorities of the time decided that this name promoted an unrefined image of the village due to the association with beer, and therefore changed the name to Bere Alston in 1898.

On 2 March 1908 it became a junction, with the opening of a branch line to Callington Road.  The PDSWJR became part of the Southern Railway in 1923 and British Railways on 1 January 1948.

The LSWR line from Okehampton to Bere Alston was closed on 6 May 1968 (as a result of the Beeching Axe), which left just the Gunnislake service running through from Plymouth and reversing at Bere Alston.  This had also been threatened with closure, but retained due to the local topography & poor nature of the local road network (though the last section to Callington had closed in November 1966).  The line from Plymouth was reduced to just a single track on 7 September 1970 and the junction changed to allow the train guard to operate the points.

On 18 March 2008 Devon County Council backed a proposal by developers Kilbride Community Rail to construct 750 houses in Tavistock that includes reopening the  line from Bere Alston to a new Tavistock railway station at a cost of £18.5million.

Services

Connections with main line services can be made at Plymouth. In 2014 there are nine services each way on Mondays to Fridays, eight on Saturdays and five on Sundays.

Community railway
The railway from Plymouth to Gunnislake is designated as a community railway and is supported by marketing provided by the Devon and Cornwall Rail Partnership.  The line is promoted under the "Tamar Valley Line" name.

The Edgcumbe Hotel in Bere Alston village is part of the Tamar Valley Line rail ale trail, which is designed to promote the use of the line.  The line is also part of the Dartmoor Sunday Rover network of integrated bus and rail routes.

References

External links
 Bere Alston – An Outline History of the Railway Station
 Bere Alston Railway Station video footage

Railway stations in Devon
Former Plymouth, Devonport and South Western Junction Railway stations
Railway stations in Great Britain opened in 1890
Railway stations served by Great Western Railway
Bere Ferrers
1890 establishments in England
DfT Category F2 stations